Ponteshio Dam  is a gravity dam located in Hokkaido Prefecture in Japan. The dam is used for power production. The catchment area of the dam is 93.8 km2. The dam impounds about 19  ha of land when full and can store 996 thousand cubic meters of water. The construction of the dam was started on 1979 and completed in 1983.

References

Dams in Hokkaido